Zylog Systems Limited (ZSL) is an international information technology company publicly listed on the National Stock Exchange of India (NSE) & Bombay Stock Exchange (BSE). Zylog is headquartered in Chennai, India and Edison, New Jersey, United States.

History
Zylog was established in 1995 by Ramanujam Venkatraman and Sudarshan Sesharathnam. Zylog is a CMMI certified provider of onshore, offshore & near-shore technology solutions and services to enterprises & technology companies.  Zylog is a Public Limited Company, listed in the Bombay Stock Exchange (BSE: 532883) and National Stock Exchange (NSE: ZYLOG) in India.

ZSL is a global Systems integrator, VAR & leading ISV.  ZSL has a presence in the US, UK, Canada, France, Switzerland, Germany, India, Singapore, Malaysia and Middle East.  ZSL employs 4,500 employees.  ZSL's market focus is small to mid-sized businesses (SMBs) and enterprises in a wide range of industries including Banking, Insurance, Finance, Manufacturing, Telecom, Wholesale, Retail, Media & Entertainment, Business Services, Pharma & Life Sciences and Healthcare.

ZSL's portfolio includes IT Outsourcing services, QA & Testing, Business Solutions (CRM & ERP), Enterprise Intelligence, Enterprise Computing, Mobile computing, cloud computing, IT Virtualization & VDI, Managed Services, SAP Services, Waste Management/Recycle Software and Industry Solutions for various verticals including Banking, Insurance, Telecom, Healthcare and Field Service.

ZSL provided product lifecycle management services, ranging with new product development, product migration, re-engineering, sustenance and support.
 1995 – Zylog Systems Limited established in Chennai, TN, India
 1996 – Opens Sales & Marketing office in Edison, NJ, USA
 2004 – Zylog Europe incorporated
 2004 – Acquires IMPECsoft and JDAN Systems
 2006 –  Established IDEA Lab, the Research & Development Division
 2007 – Acquires EWOK Soft
 2007 – Acquires Anodas Software Ltd in UK 2007 – Releases IPO through BSE & NSE
 2008 – Acquires Ducont FZ, LLC headquartered in Dubai Internet City, UAE
 2008 – Opens a new Global Software Development & Research Centre in Chennai, India
 2009 – Launches Wi5 broadband services in India
 2010 – Acquires Brainhunter, Canada
 2011 – Achieves IBM Premier Partner Status for US & India Location
 2012 – Joins Microsoft Platform Modernization Alliance
 2012 – Joins Oracle Modernization Alliance (OMA)

 Zylog Canada to participate in the Big Bike Fundraising for Heart & Stroke Foundation.Zylog Systems (Canada) Ltd ("Zylog Canada") will ride the Big Bike for the Heart&Stroke Foundation and raise donations for research and promotion of cardiovascular health
 Zylog Canada Announces a New Collaboration with CompTIA for Troops to Tech. Zylog Canada is a leading provider of IT, Engineering and Professional recruiting services and solutions with global delivery capability.
 Zylog Canada is Now a Member of the Canadian Advanced Technology Alliance (CATA).
 Canadian Advanced Technology Alliance ("CATA") Launches a New Dedicated Career Site with Zylog Canada.
 Zylog Systems Ltd (ZSL) is presenting at the Indian Institute of Management (IIM).
 Zylog Systems was investigated for a fraud. 
 In 2019, Zylog Systems closed its operations.

Offices
ZSL has offices in North America (Canada, US), Europe (UK, Switzerland, France, Germany), Asia (Singapore) and a Middle East office in Dubai, UAE and is listed in NSEI(National Stock Exchange India)
In USA, Zylog Systems Ltd has subsidiary named ZSL Inc.
Zylog Systems Limited subsidiaries are:

 Vishwa Vikas Services Limited
 Zylog Systems (Europe) Limited 
 Zylog System (India) Limited
 Zylog Systems Asia Pacific Pte Limited 
 Zylog BV Limited
 Matrix Primus Partners Inc, USA 
 Algorithm Solutions Private Limited
 Zylog Systems (Canada) Limited

Acquisitions
In 2004 ZSL acquired IMPECsoft and JDAN Systems. In 2007 it acquired EWOK Soft. In 2007 it acquired UK based insurance software provider, Anodas Software. In 2008 it acquired Ducont FZ, a mobile and wireless solutions provider based in Dubai, for $7.5 million. In 2010 it acquired Brainhunter, a Canadian IT consulting and engineering staffing services company for $33 million.

Awards
VAR Business awarded ZSL for green computing in  2008".

ZSL Announced as Finalist under Cloud Innovation & Impact Best of Show Categories at IBM Impact 2012

ZSL's Powercube DaaS (virtual desktop) Won Runner-up Award for Green IT's Virtualization Product of the Year 2012

Zylog Systems Ltd (ZSL) listed as Fastest Growing Mid-Sized Enterprises for the Year 2011 by India Inc 500

ZSL Received 2011 Cloud Computing Excellence Award

ZSL's SmartPrice Cloud Manager Won NJTC's Cool Products Competition Runner-up Award for the Year 2011

ZSL's SmartPrice Social CRM Won CRN Technology Award 2011 in the Software Productivity Category

ZSL Won Runner-up Award for the Mobile Technology Project of the Year 2011 Award from DM Magazine, UK

ZSL Listed as the Top Cloud Computing Service Provider by Talkin' Cloud TC 50 Award

References

Software companies of India
Technology companies established in 1995
Outsourcing companies
International information technology consulting firms
Information technology consulting firms of India
Software companies based in New Jersey
Software companies of the United States
Companies listed on the National Stock Exchange of India
Companies listed on the Bombay Stock Exchange